Zenbu Kimi no Sei da. (ぜんぶ君のせいだ。) is a Japanese alternative idol girl group formed in 2015. They released their debut album, "Yamikawa IMRAD", on January 27, 2016.

Members

Timeline

Discography

Studio albums

Re-recorded albums

Compilation albums

Singles

References

External links
Official website

Japanese girl groups
Japanese idol groups
Japanese pop music groups
Musical groups from Tokyo
Musical groups established in 2015
2015 establishments in Japan